Over and Over is the second album from American indie rock band The 88, released in 2005. The album includes the song "Hide Another Mistake", which has been featured on The O.C., Kyle XY and How I Met Your Mother, and the song "Not Enough", which has been featured on "Weeds".

Track listing
All songs written by Keith Slettedahl, except for where noted.
 "Hide Another Mistake" – 2:36
 "All 'Cause of You" – 3:53
 "Nobody Cares" – 3:49
 "Bowls" – 4:47
 "Head Cut Off" – 2:59
 "Battle Scar" (Slettedahl, Brandon Jay, Adam Merrin) – 3:41
 "Coming Home" – 3:38
 "You Belong to Me" – 3:27
 "Haunt You" – 2:27
 "Jesus Is Good" – 4:25
 "Everybody Loves Me" – 4:39
 "Not Enough" – 4:44

References

The 88 albums
2005 albums